Petroto is a village of the Elassona municipality. Before the 2011 local government reform it was a part of the municipality of Olympos. The 2011 census recorded 47 inhabitants in the village. Petroto is a part of the community of Kallithea Elassonos.

Population
According to the 2011 census, the population of the settlement of Petroto was 47 people, a decrease of almost 22% compared with the population of the previous census of 2001.

See also
 List of settlements in the Larissa regional unit

References

Populated places in Larissa (regional unit)